University Institute of Technology RGPV, popularly known as UIT RGPV or UIT RGTU, is a technical institute located at Bhopal, India. The institute was established by the government of Madhya Pradesh with the name "Government Engineering College" (GEC) as an autonomous institute in the year 1986. AICTE (All India Council of Technical Education) Application No./UGC Registration No./College Code is-1-136924

History 

To address the growing need of engineering expertise, the government of Madhya Pradesh created Government Engineering College (GEC) in 1986 in the state capital Bhopal. The institute initially offered Bachelor of Engineering (B.E.) only in mechanical engineering. Courses in Mining Engineering and computer science and engineering were included when it was declared autonomous in 2002. At the same time it was made a part of Rajiv Gandhi Proudyogiki Vishwavidyala (RGPV), the technological university of the state of Madhya Pradesh. The name of the institute was then changed to its current name (UIT RGPV).

References

External links 
 

Universities in Bhopal
Engineering colleges in Madhya Pradesh
Educational institutions established in 1986
1986 establishments in Madhya Pradesh